Acallepitrix is a genus of flea beetles in the family Chrysomelidae. There are more than 20 described species in Acallepitrix. They are found in the Neotropics, Central America, and North America.

Species
These 59 species belong to the genus Acallepitrix:

 Acallepitrix aegidia Bechyné, 1955
 Acallepitrix affectuosa Bechyné & Bechyné, 1961
 Acallepitrix alvarengai Scherer, 1960
 Acallepitrix angela Bechyné, 1955
 Acallepitrix anila Bechyné & Bechyné, 1963
 Acallepitrix basilepta Bechyné, 1958
 Acallepitrix boliviana Bechyné, 1959
 Acallepitrix brasiliensis Scherer, 1960
 Acallepitrix carinata (Baly, 1879)
 Acallepitrix carinulata Bechyné & Bechyné, 1961
 Acallepitrix castanea (Jacoby, 1885)
 Acallepitrix catharinae (Jacoby, 1905)
 Acallepitrix chaparensis Bechyné, 1959
 Acallepitrix clypeata (Jacoby, 1885)
 Acallepitrix coeruleata (Baly, 1876)
 Acallepitrix collaris (Weise, 1929)
 Acallepitrix constantina Bechyné, 1956
 Acallepitrix coracina (Boheman, 1859)
 Acallepitrix cyanella (Baly, 1876)
 Acallepitrix dissimulans Bechyné, 1970
 Acallepitrix erichsoni (Jacoby, 1902)
 Acallepitrix estebania Bechyné & Bechyné, 1963
 Acallepitrix freyi Bechyné, 1955
 Acallepitrix fulvifrons (Jacoby, 1885)
 Acallepitrix helga Bechyné, 1955
 Acallepitrix heterocera Bechyné, 1957
 Acallepitrix homoplana Bechyné, 1955
 Acallepitrix huallagensis Bechyné, 1959
 Acallepitrix hylophila Bechyné & Bechyné, 1963
 Acallepitrix immetallica Bechyné, 1955
 Acallepitrix inaequalis (Harold, 1877)
 Acallepitrix iris Bechyné & Bechyné, 1963
 Acallepitrix lima Bechyné, 1959
 Acallepitrix mahulena Bechyné, 1956
 Acallepitrix melanoxantha Bechyné, 1956
 Acallepitrix monilicornis Bechyné, 1970
 Acallepitrix morazanica Bechyné & Bechyné, 1963
 Acallepitrix natalensis Scherer, 1960
 Acallepitrix nigerrima Bechyné, 1958
 Acallepitrix nitens (Weise, 1929)
 Acallepitrix orbitalis Bechyné & Bechyné, 1963
 Acallepitrix pachiteensis Bechyné, 1959
 Acallepitrix paciana Bechyné & Bechyné, 1961
 Acallepitrix parahena Bechyné, 1970
 Acallepitrix pellucida Bechyné, 1970
 Acallepitrix persuavis Bechyné & Bechyné, 1963
 Acallepitrix ponderosa Bechyné & Bechyné, 1963
 Acallepitrix punctum Bechyné, 1955
 Acallepitrix raphaela Bechyné, 1955
 Acallepitrix resina Bechyné & Bechyné, 1965
 Acallepitrix rozei Bechyné, 1955
 Acallepitrix rubifrons Bechyné & Bechyné, 1963
 Acallepitrix rufobrunnea Bechyné, 1955
 Acallepitrix scaeva Bechyné, 1955
 Acallepitrix schindleri Bechyné, 1959
 Acallepitrix segregata (Baly, 1876)
 Acallepitrix sulcatipennis Bechyné, 1970
 Acallepitrix wittmeri Bechyné, 1957
 Acallepitrix zulmira Bechyné, 1970

References

Further reading

 
 
 
 
 

Alticini
Chrysomelidae genera
Articles created by Qbugbot
Beetles of North America
Beetles of South America